Andrea Vici (1743–1817) was an Italian architect and engineer, active in a  Neoclassical style. He was a pupil of Luigi Vanvitelli, and active in the Papal States comprising parts of Lazio, Umbria, and Marche.

Biography
Andrea was born in Arcevia in the Marche, the brother of Arcangelo, who was also an architect of note, leaving behind works at Jesi, Arcevia, Fano, Corinaldo, and Cupramontana. At the age of 14, Andrea was given a classical education in mathematics, letters and design by Francesco Appiani at Perugia. At the age of 17 he joined the studio of the painter Cesare Pozzi in Rome, then studied architecture under Carlo Murena. At the age of 26 years, he was recruited by the eminent architect Luigi Vanvitelli to work at the Reggia di Caserta and in the church of the Santissima Annunziata in Naples.

Moving to the Papal states, he became an important architect and engineer. He was named Count and later palatine prince, president of the Pontifical Academy of St Luke in Rome in 1802. In 1804, he was named a member of the Academy of the Arcadia, along with the architect Metastasio of the Sacra Congregazione Lauretana nel 1783. In Rome, he befriended Antonio Canova and was ultimately buried in Santa Maria in Vallicella, Rome.

Among his many designs and contributions include works for:

 Chiesa del Sacramento, Offagna
 Treia Cathedral
 Villa Votalarca, Treia
 Collegio Campana, Osimo
 Villa Bonaccorsi, Osimo
 Chapel of the Basilica of Loreto
 Monastery of Santa Caterina, Cingoli
 Portal and Chapel of the Castle of Rocca Priora, Falconara Marittima
 Grand staircase (Scalone) of Palazzo Lolli-Benigni, Fabriano 
 Fossombrone Cathedral
 Camerino Cathedral
 Hospital of Pergola
 City Hall of Poggio San Marcello
 City Hall of Bevagna
 Palazzo Porta, Gubbio
 San Francesco, Foligno
 Palazzo Connestabile della Staffa, Perugia
 Palazzo e la Cappella Gozzoli, Terni
 Casino Venuti, Cortona
 Reliefs for Villa Lante, Bagnaia
 Church of Sant’Ariano, Velletri
 Church and Monastery of Città della Pieve
 Cascata delle Marmore, Terni
 Hydraulic works in the Val di Chiana in the Romagna, Pontine marshes, Port of Fano, Aqueducts in Loreto, Perugia, and Rome

References

1743 births
1817 deaths
18th-century Italian architects
19th-century Italian architects
People from Arcevia